Desiderio Scaglia (1567 – 21 August 1639), also known as the Cardinal of Cremona, was an Italian cardinal and bishop. He was a relative of cardinals Girolamo Bernerio, Scipione Cobelluzzi and Francesco Cennini de' Salamandri and was a member of the Dominican Order.

Biography
Desiderio Scaglia was born in 1567 at Cremona in the province of Cremona in Lombardy, part of the Duchy of Milan. He was a professor in the Dominican houses of study in Cremona and other cities in Lombardy. He was a well-known theologian and preacher during his time. During the pontificate of Pope Clement VIII, he was named inquisitor in the dioceses of Pavia, Cremona and Milan. In 1616 he was called to Rome and named commissary of the Roman Inquisition.

Pope Paul V created him cardinal at the consistory of 11 January 1621.

Cardinal Scaglia was ordained bishop by Giambattista Cardinal Leni on 16 May 1621. He was appointed bishop of Melfi and Rapolla in 1621 and transferred to the diocese of Como the following year. He gave up the diocese of Como in 1632–1633 when was Camerlengo of the Sacred College of Cardinals.

He participated in the conclave of 1621 which elected Pope Gregory XV and that of 1623 which elected Pope Urban VIII.

He died in Rome on 21 August 1639 at the age of 72.

See also

Catholic Church hierarchy
College of Cardinals
List of living cardinals
Politics of Vatican City
Roman Curia

References 
This article is largely a translation of the article on the French Wikipedia.

External links
 The Cardinals of the Holy Roman Church Florida International University. Accessed 21 June 2013.

17th-century Italian cardinals
17th-century Italian Roman Catholic theologians
Clergy from Cremona
1567 births
1639 deaths
16th-century Italian clergy
Italian Dominicans
Dominican bishops
16th-century Italian Roman Catholic theologians